Dominicae Cenae is an apostolic letter written by Pope John Paul II concerning the Eucharist and its role in the life of the Church and the life of the priest. It also touches on other Eucharistic topics. 

It was promulgated on February 24, 1980, the Second Sunday of Lent. It is the second letter issued during Pope John Paul II's pontificate. 

Dominicae Cenae is divided into four major sections:

1. THE EUCHARISTIC MYSTERY IN THE LIFE OF THE CHURCH AND OF THE PRIEST
Eucharist and Priesthood
Worship of the Eucharistic Mystery
Eucharist and Church
Eucharist and Charity
Eucharist and Neighbor
Eucharist and Life

2. THE SACRED CHARACTER OF THE EUCHARIST AND SACRIFICE
Sacred Character
Sacrifice

3. THE TWO TABLES OF THE LORD AND THE COMMON POSSESSION OF THE CHURCH
The Table of the Word of God
The Table of the Bread of the Lord
A Common Possession of the Church

4. CONCLUSION

Quotes

 The Church and the world have a great need of eucharistic worship. Jesus waits for us in this sacrament of love. Let us be generous with our time in going to meet Him in adoration and in contemplation that is full of faith and ready to make reparation for the great faults and crimes of the world by our adoration never cease.
 DC§3

References

1980 in Christianity
1980 documents
Catholic spirituality
Documents of Pope John Paul II